Anexodus is a genus of longhorn beetles of the subfamily Lamiinae, containing the following species:

 Anexodus aquilus Pascoe, 1886
 Anexodus sarawakensis Sudre, 1997

References

Morimopsini
Cerambycidae genera